Rasheed Amjad (Urdu: ڈاکٹر رشید امجد) was an Urdu fiction writer, critic and scholar. He was born on 5 March 1940 in Srinagar, Indian occupied Kashmir but migrated to Pakistan after independence and later on lived in Rawalpindi, Pakistan.

He has received awards from Pakistan and India. He was also an editor of literary Urdu research magazines Daryaft and Takhilqui adab. His autobiography Aashiqi sabr talab was published in 2015.

Books

 Short stories
Tamanna Betaab, Harf Academy, Rawalpindi, 2001–2003
Kaghaz Ki Faseel, Dastawez Matbooat, Lahore, 1993
Bezaar Adam Kay Baitay, Dastawez Publishers, Rawalpindi, 1974
Rait Per Grift, Nadeem Publications, Rawalpindi, 1978
Sehpehr Ki Khizan, Dastawez Publishers, Rawalpindi, 1980
Pat Jhar Main Khudkalami, Asbaat Publications, Rawalpindi, 1984
Bhagay Hay Biaban Mujhsay, Maqbool Academy, Lahore, 1988
Dasht-e-Nazar Say Aagay, Maqbool Academy, Lahore, 1991
Aks-e-Bay Khayal, Dastawez Matbooat, Lahore, 1993
Dasht-e-Khwab, Maqbool Academy, Lahore, 1993
Gumshuda Awaz Ki Dastak, Feroze Sons, Lahore, 1996
Sat Rangay Prinday Kay Taaqub Main, Harf Academy, Rawalpindi, 2002
Aik Aam Admi Ka Khwab, Harf Academy, Rawalpindi, 2006
Aam Admi Kay Khwab, Poorab Academy, Islamabad, 2007

 Research, criticism and editing
Naya Adab, Tameer-e-Millat Publishers, Mandi Bahauddin, 1969
Rawayyay Aur Shanakhtain, Maqbool Academy, Lahore, 1988
Yaft-o-Daryaft, Maqbool Academy, Lahore, 1989
Shairi Ki Siyasi-o-Fikri Riwayat, Dastawez Matbooat, Lahore, 1993
Meerajee – Shakhsiat Aur Fan, Maghrabi Pakistan Academy, 1995
Pakistani Adab Kay Memar (Meerajee), Pakistan Academy of Letters, Islamabad, 2006
Pakistani Adab (6 Volume), F.G. Sir Syed College, Rawalpindi, 1980–1984
Iqbal Fikr-o-Fan, Nadeem Publications, Rawalpindi, 1984
Taleem Ki Nazriati Asas, Nadeem Publications, Rawalpindi, 1984
Mirza Adeeb – Shakhsiat-o-Fan, Maqbool Academy, Lahore, 1991
Pakistani Adab (Prose) 1990, Pakistan Academy of Letters, Islamabad, 1991
Pakistani Adab (Prose & Fiction) 1991, Pakistan Academy of Letters, Islamabad, 1992
Pakistani Adab (Prose & Fiction) 1994, Pakistan Academy of Letters, Islamabad, 1995
Muzahmati Adab Urdu (1977–1985), Pakistan Academy of Letters, Islamabad
Muzahmati Adab Urdu (1998–2008), Pakistan Academy of Letters, Islamabad, 2009
Pakistani Adab (Afsana), (1947–2008), Pakistan Academy of Letters, Islamabad, 2009
Pakistani Adab (Poetry), (1947–2008), Pakistan Academy of Letters, Islamabad, 2009
Pakistani Adab (Rawaye aur Rujhanat) Poorab Academy, Islamabad, 2009
Aashiqi sabr talab (Autobiography) "Saanjh Publications", Lahore, 2015

Journals edited

Dastawez, Dastawez Publications, Rawalpindi
Iqra, Federal Govt. Educational Directorate, GHQ, Rawalpindi
Daryaft, National University of Modern Languages, Islamabad
Takhliqi Adab, National University of Modern Languages, Islamabad

Death
He died on 3 March 2021.

References

1940 births
Pakistani people of Kashmiri descent
Kashmiri writers
Living people
Pakistani literary critics
People from Rawalpindi
People from Srinagar
Urdu-language novelists